Rachael Robertson may refer to:

Rachael Robertson (television presenter), former British television continuity announcer and presenter
Rachael Robertson (writer) (born 1969), Australian author, expedition leader, and speaker

See also
Rachel Robertson (born 1976), New Zealand field hockey player 
Rachel Roberts (disambiguation)